Kate Cann (born 1954) is an English journalist and writer of fiction.

Biography

Kate Cann wrote stories and diaries in her youth, and took two degrees in English and American Literature at the University of Kent, B.A., 1977, M.A., 1978. She began work 'in the 1980s...in a publishing house, Time Life Books, as a copy-editor', and when working on a piece of young adult fiction decided to herself that she could do better - in her own words, 'got bitten by the "I can do better than this" bug, and started writing...it took me over'. Once Diving In (1983?) was published, she began writing full-time.

Kate Cann currently resides in Wiltshire.

Sources and themes

'Cann drew from personal experience as a former teen, a mother, and an editor familiar with available YA literature, in developing her first book'. By the time she 'ran out of material from my diaries and memories, I realised that my daughter and son were teenagers, and started eavesdropping on them and their friends'.

A prime motivator of her writing was the way 'teenage books...treated sexual relationships: they were either full of gloom and doom, or were gushy, unrealistic candyfloss'. Kate offers by contrast a certain verismo: 'I focus on the real things that don't change - like love and anger and happiness and jealousy'.

A secondary, but almost equally important theme in her work is the struggle against the (often subtly) controlling figure. This may be a boyfriend who is 'a control freak. Scared to let us have differences'; a "Best Friend" for imitation - 'I flattered her, I...mirrored her and buoyed her up'; or a parent like the heroine's mother in Hard Cash: 'A real living breathing human vampire. She's feeding off you...turning on the emotional blackmail at full power'. Alternatively, the controlling force - "denying the separateness of the other" - may be a group cult, whether a formal one (Speeding) or an informal subculture, like the hero's 'bond to the team...their triumphant, tribal energy' in Leader of the Pack.

Such controlling powers may be seen as externalisations of the adolescent's quest for identity achievement, in the face of both inner and outer obstacles. Cann's protagonists, under both social and sexual pressures, regularly face the alternative peril of identity diffusion: 'You're not you any longer, you're what he wants you to be. A shadow person, a non-person, no centre, no wholeness. Just a limp hotchpotch of what someone else once wanted you to be'.

Despite such dangers, Cann's own predilection remains nonetheless firmly for engagement with life - for "diving in"; and even when her heroes do temporarily trade in their own identities for an externally formulated one - whether 'a dream of money' or a social group, 'the team and everything' - they typically conclude, '"Well, I don't wish it hadn't happened"'; "I'm glad I was part of it. It's part of me now...and I'm glad about that too".

Publications

Young adult fiction

Diving In         [Ready?]
In the Deep End   [Sex]
Sink or Swim      [Go!]Moving Out        [Hard Cash]Moving In         [Shacked Up]Moving On         [Speeding]Footloose         [Grecian Holiday]Fiesta            [Spanish Holiday]Escape            [California Holiday]Sea Change        [Mediterranean Holiday]Leaving PoppyLeader of the PackCrow GirlCrow Girl ReturnsPossessed (Rayne Series)Consumed (Rayne Series)Fire (Rayne Series) a.k.a. consumedYoung adult non-fiction
Kate Cann, Living in the World'' (London 1997)

References

External links
Official website

1954 births
Living people
20th-century English novelists
21st-century English novelists
English women novelists
British writers of young adult literature
Women writers of young adult literature
21st-century English women writers
20th-century English women writers